Classical realism may refer to:

 Classical Realism, an artistic movement in the late-20th and early 21st century
 Classical realism (international relations), a theory established in the post-World War II era

See also 
 Realism (disambiguation)